The 2020 UEFA Super Cup was the 45th edition of the UEFA Super Cup, an annual football match organised by UEFA and contested by the reigning champions of the two main European club competitions, the UEFA Champions League and the UEFA Europa League. The match featured German club Bayern Munich, the winners of the 2019–20 UEFA Champions League, and Spanish club Sevilla, the winners of the 2019–20 UEFA Europa League. It was played at the Puskás Aréna in Budapest, Hungary on 24 September 2020.

The match was originally scheduled to be played at the Estádio do Dragão in Porto, Portugal, on 12 August 2020. However, after the COVID-19 pandemic in Europe caused the postponements of the previous season's club finals, the UEFA Executive Committee chose to award the rescheduled Champions League final to Portugal, and postponed and relocated the Super Cup to Budapest.

Following discussions with its 55 member associations on 19 August 2020, the UEFA Executive Committee decided on 25 August 2020 to use the 2020 UEFA Super Cup as a pilot match for which a reduced number of spectators, up to 30% of the capacity of the stadium, can be allowed in, and it became the first official UEFA match to have spectators since their competitions were resumed in August 2020.

Bayern Munich won the match 2–1 after extra time to secure their second UEFA Super Cup title.

Teams

Venue

The Estádio do Dragão was scheduled to stage its first ever UEFA Super Cup match. It had hosted the UEFA Euro 2004 and the 2019 UEFA Nations League Final. The city of Porto and Portugal as a whole, however, had seen one Super Cup match before in 1987, as the now-demolished Estádio das Antas hosted the second leg.

This was the first UEFA club competition final hosted at the Puskás Aréna and the second for Budapest and Hungary, having hosted the 2019 UEFA Women's Champions League Final at the Groupama Arena. Prior to the relocation, the stadium had been selected as one of the hosts for the UEFA Euro 2020 as well as hosting the 2022 UEFA Europa League Final, before being rescheduled to 2023.

Original host selection
An open bidding process was launched on 8 December 2017 by UEFA to select the venue of the UEFA Super Cup in 2020. Associations had until 12 January 2018 to express interest, and bid dossiers had to be submitted by 29 March 2018. Associations hosting matches at UEFA Euro 2020 were not allowed to bid for the 2020 UEFA Super Cup.

UEFA announced on 15 January 2018 that nine associations had expressed interest in hosting the 2020 UEFA Super Cup.

The Estádio do Dragão was selected by the UEFA Executive Committee during their meeting in Kyiv on 24 May 2018.

Relocation to Budapest
As a result of the COVID-19 pandemic in Europe, the previous season's club finals were postponed and relocated. This includes the 2020 UEFA Champions League Final, which the UEFA Executive Committee moved to the Estádio do Dragão in Porto on 17 June 2020. At the same time, UEFA postponed and relocated the Super Cup from the Estádio do Dragão to the Puskás Aréna in Budapest.

Pre-match

Ticketing
Tickets were on sale for the general public until 9 September 2020. Moreover, 3,000 tickets were available for the supporters of each team. In total, 15,500 tickets were sold. Strict hygiene measures, including social distancing and wearing of face masks when social distancing could not be respected, were in place during the match. Ticket holders from overseas had to present proof of a negative SARS-CoV-2 PCR test performed within three days of entry, and had to leave the country within 72 hours after their entry.

Despite Hungarian government insisting that the match would be safe to attend, there was opposition to the decision to have spectators. Hungarian politician Ildikó Borbély called the game an "unacceptable experiment", while Minister President of Bavaria Markus Söder urged Bayern fans not to travel, fearing that the match could turn into a "hotbed for COVID-19 to spread". Hungarian Medical Chamber advisor, epidemiologist András Csilek, stated that the Chamber also considered it wrong, saying that it "carries unnecessary risk adding" and "shouldn't be allowed".

Officials
On 15 September 2020, UEFA named English official Anthony Taylor as the referee for the match. Taylor had been a FIFA referee since 2013, and previously worked as one of the additional assistant referees in the 2014 UEFA Super Cup, 2015 UEFA Europa League Final, 2016 UEFA Champions League Final and UEFA Euro 2016 Final. He was joined by his fellow countrymen, with Gary Beswick and Adam Nunn as assistant referees, Stuart Attwell as the video assistant referee (VAR) and Paul Tierney as the assistant VAR. Israeli referee Orel Grinfeld served as the fourth official.

Match

Summary
Sevilla were awarded a penalty after 13 minutes when Ivan Rakitić was blocked and bundled over in the penalty area by David Alaba. Lucas Ocampos scored the penalty shooting to the left corner to put Sevilla ahead. Leon Goretzka made it 1–1 in the 34th minute, with a side foot finish to the left corner of the net after a take down assist from Robert Lewandowski.	
The game went into extra time, with substitute Javi Martínez getting the winner for Bayern in the 104th minute with a powerful header to the top left corner of the net when the ball fell to him, after Sevilla goalkeeper Yassine Bounou had punched the ball back into play.

Details
The Champions League winners were designated as the "home" team for administrative purposes.

Statistics

See also
2020 UEFA Champions League Final
2020 UEFA Europa League Final
2020 UEFA Women's Champions League Final
FC Bayern Munich in international football
Sevilla FC in European football

Notes

References

External links

2020
Super Cup
September 2020 sports events in Europe
FC Bayern Munich matches
Sevilla FC matches
2020–21 in Spanish football
2020
International club association football competitions hosted by Hungary
2020s in Budapest
2020–21 in Hungarian football
Association football events postponed due to the COVID-19 pandemic